This is a list of all stations of the Delhi Metro, a rapid transit system serving Delhi and its satellite cities in the National Capital Region of India. Delhi Metro is built and operated by the Delhi Metro Rail Corporation Limited (DMRC) and the first section was opened on 25 December 2002 on the Red Line.

Sikanderpur station offers an interchange with Gurgaon Metro via a 90 m × 9 m walkway. 

Noida Sector 52 station offers an interchange with Noida Metro.

Each line of the Delhi Metro is identified by a specific colour. The system uses rolling stocks of both broad gauge and standard gauge trains, and has a combination of elevated, underground and at-grade lines. The Metro is open from about 05:00 to 00:00, with trains operating at a peak frequency of 2–3 minutes, and has an average daily count of 2,760,000 commuters.

Metro stations

Statistics

See also

List of Namma Metro stations
List of Kolkata Metro stations
List of Mumbai Metro stations
List of Jaipur Metro stations
List of Chennai Metro stations
List of Lucknow Metro stations
List of Kochi Metro stations
List of Noida Metro stations
List of Nagpur Metro stations
List of Ahmedabad Metro stations

Notes

References

External links

 Official website of Delhi Metro Rail Corporation Ltd. (DMRC)
 Delhi Metro station information

Delhi
Delhi Metro stations
 
Stations